The  was a championship created and promoted by New Japan Pro-Wrestling.

History 
The title was established on September 29, 1990 during Antonio Inoki's career 30th anniversary as an addition to creation of the Greatest 18 Club (a hall of fame) consisting of Lou Thesz, Karl Gotch, Nick Bockwinkel, Johnny Powers, Johnny Valentine, André the Giant, Stan Hansen, Wim Ruska, Billy Robinson, Hiro Matsuda, Bob Backlund, Verne Gagne, Strong Kobayashi, Hulk Hogan, Muhammad Ali, Seiji Sakaguchi, Antonio Inoki and initially Tiger Jeet Singh later replaced by Dusty Rhodes.

Riki Choshu was the first champion, being awarded the title by Lou Thesz on February 25, 1991. He successfully defended his title against Tiger Jeet Singh at Starrcade in Tokyo Dome, Shinya Hashimoto on day 3 of Tokyo 3 Days Battle and Tatsumi Fujinami at Super Warriors in Tokyo Dome.

The Great Muta retired the championship moments after winning it, in order to focus on his IWGP Heavyweight Championship title defenses.

Reigns

References

Heavyweight wrestling championships
New Japan Pro-Wrestling championships